Adélaïde Koudougnon Ozoua (born 1977) is an Ivorian former athlete and a former football player and manager. 

As an athlete, Koudougnon has competed in heptathlon, hurdling, long jump and triple jump. As a footballer, she played first as a right back, then as a right winger and finally as an attacking midfielder. She has been a member of the Ivory Coast women's national team as both player and manager.

Athletics career
Koudougnon is a bronze medalist in the triple jump at the 1995 African Junior Championships in Bouaké. She was then a bronze medalist in heptathlon at the 1996 African Championships in Athletics in Yaoundé.

Koudougnon was crowned champion of Ivory Coast in the 100 metres hurdles in 1994, 1995 and 1998, the 200 meters hurdles in 1994, the long jump in 1995 and 1998 and the triple jump in 1994 and 1995.

Football career

Club career
Koudougnon began her football career in 1987 for Carpes Rouges, a team from San-Pédro. She was a national champion with this side in 1993. Five years later, she moved to Abidjan-based club Juventus de Yopougon, which she has won the league four times and was distinguished as best player in 2000.

International career
Koudougnon capped for Ivory Coast at senior level during the 2002 African Women's Championship qualification.

International goals
Scores and results list Ivory Coast's goal tally first

Managerial career
In 2002, Koudougnon was player-coach for Juventus de Yopougon and was the best league manager that year. She became the head coach of the Ivory Coast women's national team in 2004. She was replaced by Clémentine Touré in February 2010.

References

1983 births
Living people
Ivorian female athletes
Ivorian heptathletes
Ivorian female hurdlers
Ivorian female long jumpers
Female triple jumpers
Ivorian women's footballers
Women's association football fullbacks
Women's association football midfielders
Women's association football wingers
Ivory Coast women's international footballers
Association football player-managers
Ivorian football managers
Female association football managers
Women's association football managers
Ivory Coast women's national football team managers